Sand Hill, West Virginia may refer to:

Sand Hill, Marshall County, West Virginia, an unincorporated community
Sand Hill, Wood County, West Virginia, an unincorporated community